Gonzalo Ezequiel Heredia (born March 12, 1982 in Munro, Buenos Aires, Argentina) is an Argentine actor.

Personal life 
Since 2010, Gonzalo Heredia is in a relationship with the actress, Brenda Gandini whom he met in the recordings of Malparida. On August 16, 2011, the couple's first child, a boy, was born whom they called Eloy Heredia. On August 22, 2017, the couple's second child was born, a girl who they called Alfonsina Heredia.

Filmography

Television

Movies

Theater

Awards and nominations

References

External links
 

Living people
1982 births
Argentine male telenovela actors
People from Buenos Aires